Allafi is a surname. Notable people with the surname include:

Agnes Allafi (born 1959), Chadian politician and sociologist
Rabee Allafi, Libyan footballer